The deep artery of the penis (artery to the corpus cavernosum), one of the terminal branches of the internal pudendal, arises from that vessel while it is situated between the two fasciæ of the urogenital diaphragm (deep perineal pouch).

It pierces the inferior fascia, and, entering the crus penis obliquely, runs forward in the center of the corpus cavernosum penis, to which its branches are distributed.

Additional images

References

External links
 
 

Arteries of the abdomen
Human penis anatomy